Hoheria glabrata, the mountain lacebark or ribbonwood, is a species of flowering plant in the family Malvaceae, endemic to New Zealand.

Mainly found in the wetter parts of the mountainous regions of the South Island. Leaves are toothed around the margins, also look for the distinctive heart shape of the leaf which differentiates it from the very similar Hoheria lyallii. H. glabrata is a small tree which often grows multiple branches from the base although this does not always occur. Both the bark of Hoheria glabrata and Hoheria lyallii (known in Māori as houi) were likely used as textiles by South Island Māori.

References

glabrata
Endemic flora of New Zealand